Thomas Begbie was a Scotland international rugby union player. His regular playing position was Fullback.

Rugby Union career

Amateur career

Begbie played for Edinburgh Wanderers.

In 1881 Begbie moved to play for Glasgow Academicals.
 
That same year Begbie went back to playing for Edinburgh Wanderers.

In 1884 Begbie was playing for Merchistonians.

Provincial career

Begbie played for Edinburgh District in the 1880 inter-city match against Glasgow District. He scored a try and conversion in the match.

Begbie played for East of Scotland District in the February 1881 match against West of Scotland District.

International career

Begbie was capped twice for Scotland in 1881.

Business career

Begbie became a merchant; and was named as such on his death in the probate calendar of 1896. His estate was valued at £7259, 0 shillings, and 5 pence.

Family

Begbie's parents were Thomas Begbie (1816-1878) and Christina Stodart Aitchison (1824-1864). He had two brothers: George Begbie (1857-1888) and John Aitchison Begbie (1859-1907). He married Hetty; she re-married, after Thomas's death in 1896 in Hampstead, to George Theodore Born of London on 11 June 1898.

John Aitchison Begbie also played for Edinburgh Wanderers.

References

1862 births
1896 deaths
East of Scotland District players
Edinburgh District (rugby union) players
Edinburgh Wanderers RFC players
Glasgow Academicals rugby union players
Merchistonian FC players
Rugby union players from Gullane
Scotland international rugby union players
Scottish rugby union players
Rugby union fullbacks